William Fambrough (1916–1983) was an American photographer who worked in Kansas City, where he documented African American life through his photographs for three decades.

Biography
Fambrough was born in Little Rock, Arkansas, and moved with his family to Kansas City, Missouri when he was young. After graduating from Lincoln High School in 1935, he studied graphic arts at Lincoln University and then served in World War II. After three years in the military, Fambrough returned to photography, working for the weekly magazine The Call and as a freelance photographer. From the 1950s to the 1970s, he captured images of the African American experience in Kansas City. Many of his photographs also appeared uncredited in The Kansas City Star. Fambrough came to be known by his nickname “One Shot Fambrough.”

References

External Links
 Missouri Remembers: Artists in Missouri through 1951

1916 births
1983 deaths
Lincoln University (Missouri) alumni
20th-century American photographers
African Americans in World War II
People from Little Rock, Arkansas